Gabaldon, officially the Municipality of Gabaldon (Ilocano: Ili ti Gabaldon), is a 3rd class municipality in the province of Nueva Ecija, Philippines. According to the 2020 census, it has a population of 38,958 people.

The municipality is located on the valley situated at the footstep of the Sierra Madre Mountains on the east and the Caraballo Mountains on the west. Gabaldon is bounded by the municipalities of Bongabon to the north, Laur to the west, General Tinio to the south, and Dingalan, Aurora to the east.

Etymology
On June 16, 1955, the town's name was change from Sabani to Gabaldon in honor of the former provincial governor and Philippine Resident Commissioner Isauro Gabaldón.

History
During the latter half of the 19th century, Gabaldon was the site of the Sabani Estate, the largest hacienda in Nueva Ecija, which was then part of Laur. The estate possessed 3,000 heads of cattle and occupied more than 6,000 hectares.  On May 10, 1920, the National Government through the National Development Company took over the administration of the estate and developed it for rice production. A group composed of local businessmen leased the estate until 1935, after which it was returned to Sabani Estate Development Company. The government then converted the estate into a homestead.

On June 12, 1950, the barrios of Bitulok, Bantug, Bitulok Saw Mill, Cuyapa, Macasandal, Pantok, Calumpang, Malinao, Tagumpay, Bugnan, Bagong Sicat, Ligaya, Calabasa, Bateria and Pintong Bagting were separated from Laur to constitute the new municipality of Bitulok.

The municipality's name was changed from Bitulok to Sabani. On June 16, 1955, the municipality's name was changed from Sabani to Gabaldon by virtue of Republic Act 1318, to honor former provincial governor and Philippine Resident Commissioner Isauro Gabaldón.

Geography

Barangays
Gabaldon is politically subdivided into 16 barangays.

 Bagong Sikat
 Bagting
 Bantug
 Bitulok (North Poblacion)
 Bugnan
 Calabasa
 Camachile
 Cuyapa
 Ligaya
 Macasandal
 Malinao
 Pantoc
 Pinamalisan
 South Poblacion
 Sawmill
 Tagumpay

Climate

Demographics

Economy 

Agriculture is the main economic source of the municipality with 56% of its land area being used for farming. Rice is the primary crop being cultivated in the municipality's lowland while secondary crops such as onion, corn, garlic, ampalaya, and other crops are cultivated in the uplands. The municipality is one of the top onion producers in the province. Limited livestock, poultry, and fish production are also present.

The municipality has nearly 300 commercial establishments mostly centered along the national road and around the municipal public market. Moreover, there are 6 agro-based industrial establishments within the city, including 5 rice mills and a commercial poultry, and 20 cottage industry establishments.

Tourism

Due to the Gabaldon's proximity to the coastal town of Dingalan, Aurora and its scenic location on the valley, there are several ecological tourist spots that are found in the municipality including; the Dupinga Water Reservoir, the Sierra Madre Mountains, Cabangcalan Lake, and multiple waterfalls dotted along the southeastern part of the Sierra Madre Mountains. Numerous resorts are located in the municipality, including the Ecopark located inside the Gabaldon-Campus of the Nueva Ecija University of Science and Technology.

See also
List of renamed cities and municipalities in the Philippines

References

External links

 [ Philippine Standard Geographic Code]
Philippine Census Information
Local Governance Performance Management System 

Municipalities of Nueva Ecija